John and Tracy Austin defeated Mark Edmondson and Dianne Fromholtz in the final, 4–6, 7–6(8–6), 6–3 to win the mixed doubles tennis title at the 1980 Wimbledon Championships.

Bob Hewitt and Greer Stevens were the reigning champions, but Hewitt did not compete. Stevens partnered with Colin Dowdeswell, but they lost to the Austins in the quarterfinals.

Seeds

  Frew McMillan /  Betty Stöve (semifinals)
  Dick Stockton /  Billie Jean King (quarterfinals)
  John Newcombe /  Evonne Cawley (second round)
  Ross Case /  Wendy Turnbull (semifinals)
  Vijay Amritraj /  Anne Smith (second round)
  Mark Edmondson /  Dianne Fromholtz (final)
  Colin Dowdeswell /  Greer Stevens (quarterfinals)
  Anand Amritraj /  Rosemary Casals (quarterfinals)

Draw

Finals

Top half

Section 1

Section 2

Bottom half

Section 3

Section 4

References

External links

1980 Wimbledon Championships – Doubles draws and results at the International Tennis Federation

X=Mixed Doubles
Wimbledon Championship by year – Mixed doubles